FHHS may refer to:
 Fairmont Heights High School (Maryland), Landover, Prince George's County, Maryland, United States
 Federal Hocking High School, Stewart, Ohio, United States
 Forest Hills High School (Pennsylvania), Sidman, Pennsylvania, United States
 Forest Hills High School (New York), in Queens, New York City, United States
 Francis Howell High School, Weldon Spring, Missouri, United States
 Friday Harbor High School, Friday Harbor, Washington, United States
 Fort Hunt High School, Alexandria, Virginia, United States

 Forest Hill High School, West Palm Beach, Florida